Vincent Price (1911–1993) American actor

Vincent Price may also refer to:

Vincent Price (cricketer) (1895–1973), English cricketer
Vincent Price (educator), incumbent president of Duke University
Vincent Price (architect) (1868–?), railway architect in Brisbane, Queensland, Australia
"Vincent Price" (song), a 2013 song by Deep Purple from the album Now What?!
Vincent Price Art Museum, an art museum located at East Los Angeles College

Price, Vincent